Tricentennial Park is the name of several parks throughout the United States:

William G. Milliken State Park and Harbor– formerly the Tri-centennial State Park in Michigan
Tricentennial Park (Albany, New York)
Tricentennial Park (Ponce, Puerto Rico)

Tricentennial anniversaries